The Chamber of Deputies is the lower house of the Plurinational Legislative Assembly of Bolivia. The composition and powers of this house are established in the Political Constitution of the State. The session room is located in the Legislative Palace building in Plaza Murillo.

Deputies
The Chamber of Deputies comprises 130 seats, elected using the additional member system: 70 deputies are elected to represent single-member electoral districts, 7 of which are Indigenous or Campesino seats elected by the usos y costumbres of minority groups, 60 are elected by proportional representation from party lists on a departmental basis. Deputies also serve five-year terms, and must be aged at least 25 on the day of the election. Party lists are required to alternate between men and women, and in the single-member districts, men are required to run with a female alternate, and vice versa. At least 50% of the deputies from single-member districts are required to be women.

Electoral system
The 130 members in the Chamber of Deputies (Cámara de Diputados) (excluding the seven special seats) are elected using the additional member system. Using first-past-the-post voting, 63 seats are elected in single-member districts. Another 60 additional seats are elected using closed list party-list proportional representation in districts of varying sizes corresponding to Bolivia's nine departments with a threshold of 3%. The additional seats in each region are awarded proportionally based on the vote for the presidential candidates, subtracting the number of single-member districts won. The remaining seven seats are reserved indigenous seats elected by the usos y costumbres, using first-past-the-post voting. A voter can only vote in one of either the normal constituencies or special constituencies.

Elections

2020 election

Parliamentary parties

References

1831 establishments in Bolivia
National lower houses
Government of Bolivia